Zvezda Zvenigorod (lit. Star Zvenigorod) is a Russian women's handball club from Zvenigorod, near Moscow. They won the Champions League and the Champions Trophy in 2008, and the EHF Cup in 2006/07. Between 2006 and 2011 the club was coached by Russian national team trainer Evgeny Trefilov. In the summer of 2011 he was replaced by head coach Zdravko Zovko.

In reaction to the 2022 Russian invasion of Ukraine, the International Handball Federation banned Russian athletes, and the European Handball Federation suspended the  Russian clubs from competing in European handball competitions.

Achievements

Russia
Russian Super League 
Winners: 2007
Runners-up: 2008, 2009, 2010
Third place: 2006, 2013
Russian Cup 
Winners: 2009, 2010, 2011, 2014
Runners-up: 2012, 2013
Third place: 2015, 2019
Russian Supercup 
Winners: 2014

European competitions
EHF Champions League
Winner: 2007–08
Women's EHF Cup
Winners: 2006–07 
EHF Champions Trophy
Winners: 2008
Runners-up: 2007

Team

Current squad 
Squad for the 2020-21 season.

Goalkeepers
 12  Ekaterina Kirikias
 48  Yulia Dolgih
 64  Serafima Tikhanova
Wingers
RW
 37  Daria Kurmaz
 77  Albina Murzalieva
LW
 8  Victoriya Klimantseva
 10  Marianna Egorova
 95  Alexandra Karpova
Line players
 22  Irina Antonova
 23  Alina Sinelnikova
 39  Stanislava Gerasimova

Back players
LB
 3  Yuliya Chernova
 5  Alisa Dvorcevaya
 11  Anastasia Suslova
 40  Elizaveta Sobina
 44  Anastasia Shavman
 81  Kseniya Dyachenko
CB
 4  Nadezda Osipova
 14  Aksana Pantus
 50  Lada Samoylenko
 63  Anastasiya Tserkovniuk (c)
RB
 15  Alina Triobchuk
 20  Valeriya Ganicheva
 33  Anna Nikolaeva
 55  Natalia Nikitina

Notable players 
 Irina Poltoratskaya
 Oxana Romenskaya
 Anna Kareyeva
 Elena Dmitrieva
 Anastasia Lobach
 Natalia Shipilova
 Yekaterina Andryushina
 Yelena Polenova
 Ekaterina Vetkova
 Polina Vyakhireva
 Liudmila Postnova
 Alexandra Lacrabere
 Samira Rocha

References

External links 
 Official site 

Russian handball clubs
Sport in Moscow Oblast